Laminacauda is a genus of dwarf spiders that was first described by Alfred Frank Millidge in 1985.

Species
 it contains forty species, found in Argentina, Bolivia, Brazil, Chile, Colombia, Ecuador, Panama, Peru, and Uruguay:
Laminacauda aluminensis Millidge, 1991 – Argentina
Laminacauda amabilis (Keyserling, 1886) – Peru
Laminacauda ansoni Millidge, 1991 – Chile (Juan Fernandez Is.)
Laminacauda argentinensis Millidge, 1985 – Argentina
Laminacauda baerti Miller, 2007 – Panama, Colombia, Galapagos Is.
Laminacauda boliviensis Millidge, 1985 – Bolivia
Laminacauda cognata Millidge, 1991 – Chile (Juan Fernandez Is.)
Laminacauda dentichelis (Berland, 1913) – Ecuador
Laminacauda diffusa Millidge, 1985 (type) – Chile, Argentina, Falkland Is.
Laminacauda dysphorica (Keyserling, 1886) – Peru, Bolivia
Laminacauda expers Millidge, 1991 – Peru
Laminacauda fuegiana (Tullgren, 1901) – Chile, Falkland Is.
Laminacauda gigas Millidge, 1991 – Chile (Juan Fernandez Is.)
Laminacauda grata Millidge, 1991 – Colombia
Laminacauda insulana Millidge, 1985 – Tristan da Cunha
Laminacauda luscinia Millidge, 1985 – Tristan da Cunha
Laminacauda magna Millidge, 1991 – Chile (Juan Fernandez Is.)
Laminacauda malkini Millidge, 1991 – Chile (Juan Fernandez Is.)
Laminacauda maxima Millidge, 1985 – Tristan da Cunha
Laminacauda montevidensis (Keyserling, 1878) – Brazil, Uruguay, Argentina
Laminacauda monticola Millidge, 1985 – Bolivia
Laminacauda nana Millidge, 1991 – Chile
Laminacauda newtoni Millidge, 1985 – Chile, Argentina
Laminacauda orina (Chamberlin, 1916) – Peru
Laminacauda pacifica (Berland, 1924) – Chile (Juan Fernandez Is.)
Laminacauda parvipalpis Millidge, 1985 – Chile
Laminacauda peruensis Millidge, 1985 – Peru
Laminacauda plagiata (Tullgren, 1901) – Chile, Argentina, Falkland Is.
Laminacauda propinqua Millidge, 1991 – Chile (Juan Fernandez Is.)
Laminacauda rubens Millidge, 1991 – Chile (Juan Fernandez Is.)
Laminacauda sacra Millidge, 1991 – Bolivia
Laminacauda salsa Millidge, 1991 – Chile
Laminacauda suavis Millidge, 1991 – Colombia
Laminacauda sublimis Millidge, 1991 – Peru
Laminacauda thayerae Millidge, 1985 – Chile
Laminacauda tristani Millidge, 1985 – Tristan da Cunha
Laminacauda tuberosa Millidge, 1991 – Chile (Juan Fernandez Is.)
Laminacauda tucumani Millidge, 1991 – Argentina
Laminacauda vicana (Keyserling, 1886) – Peru
Laminacauda villagra Millidge, 1991 – Chile (Juan Fernandez Is.)

See also
 List of Linyphiidae species (I–P)

References

Araneomorphae genera
Linyphiidae
Spiders of South America